The 2005–06 season saw Dynamo Dresden relegated from the  2. Bundesliga. After a strong start, they went on a run of 13 matches without a win, which put them in relegation danger and cost manager Christoph Franke his job. Former Austria international Peter Pacult took over, and made major changes to the squad in mid-season. Results improved, but Dynamo were unable to avoid the drop, finishing 15th.

Squad

Results

2. Bundesliga

DFB-Pokal

Transfers

External links
Season details at fussballdaten 

Dynamo Dresden seasons
Dynamo Dresden